Ta (hiragana: た, katakana: タ) is one of the Japanese kana, which each represent one mora. Both represent .  た originates from the Chinese character 太, while タ originates from 多.

Stroke order

Other communicative representations

 Full Braille representation

 Computer encodings

References

Specific kana